The tobacco industry playbook, tobacco strategy or simply disinformation playbook describes a strategy devised by the tobacco industry in the 1950s to protect revenues in the face of mounting evidence of links between tobacco smoke and serious illnesses, primarily cancer. Much of the playbook is known from industry documents made public by whistleblowers or as a result of the Tobacco Master Settlement Agreement. These documents are now curated by the UCSF Truth Tobacco Industry Documents project and are a primary source for much commentary on both the tobacco playbook and its similarities to the tactics used by other industries, notably the fossil fuel industry. It is possible that the playbook may even have originated with the oil industry.

A 1969 R. J. Reynolds internal memorandum noted, "Doubt is our product since it is the best means of competing with the 'body of fact' that exists in the mind of the general public."

In Merchants of Doubt, Naomi Oreskes and Erik Conway documented the way that tobacco companies had campaigned over several decades to cast doubt on the scientific evidence of harm caused by their products, and noted the same techniques being used by other industries whose harmful products were targets of regulatory and environmental efforts. This is often linked to climate change denialism promoted by the fossil fuel industry: the same tactics were employed by fossil fuel groups such as the American Petroleum Institute to cast doubt on climate science from the 1990s and some of the same PR firms and individuals engaged to claim that tobacco smoking was safe, were later recruited to attack climate science.

History
The strategy was initiated at a crisis meeting between US tobacco executives and John Hill, of public relations company Hill & Knowlton, at the New York Plaza Hotel, in 1953, following the Reader's Digest'''s précis of an article from the Christian Herald titled "Cancer by the Carton", highlighting the emergent findings of epidemiologists including Richard Doll and Austin Bradford Hill. It led to the 1954 publication of A Frank Statement, an advertisement designed to cast doubt on the science showing serious health effects from smoking.

Tactics included:
 "Fear, uncertainty and doubt", including funding studies designed to undermine scientific consensus on the health effects of tobacco and characterising findings of harm as "junk science";
 Astroturfing;
 Lobbying and political talking points;
 Emphasising self-regulation and personal responsibility.

Documents such as Bad Science: A Resource Book were used to promulgate talking points intended to cast doubt on scientific independence and political interference.
Influence
The playbook has been adopted by the fossil fuel industry, in its efforts to stave off global action on climate change, and by those seeking to undermine the United States Environmental Protection Agency (EPA) more generally. The manufacture and promotion of uncertainty, especially, has been identified as inspired directly by the tobacco industry.

Recognising that it had little or no credibility with the public, and concerned about mounting pressure to act on environmental tobacco smoke (ETS), the tobacco industry actively recruited fellow enemies of the EPA, setting up the "Advancement of Sound Science Coalition" (TASSC), a fake grassroots group. Its first director was Steve Milloy, previously of APCO, the consultancy firm employed by Philip Morris to set up TASSC. Milloy subsequently set up junkscience.com, a website which equates environmentalists with Nazis and now promotes climate change denial. Many of the consultants who worked for the tobacco industry, have also worked for fossil fuel companies against action on climate change. TASSC hired Frederick Seitz and Fred Singer, both now prominent in climate change denial. Greg Zimmerman found a 2015 presentation titled "Survival Is Victory: Lessons From the Tobacco Wars" by Richard Reavey of Cloud Peak Energy (and formerly of Philip Morris) in which Reavey explicitly acknowledged the parallels and urged fellow coal executives to accept the facts of climate change and work with regulators on solutions that would preserve the industry. Both Fred Singer and Frederick Seitz are prominent figures in climate change denial who previously worked for the tobacco industry.

Environmentalist George Monbiot identifies many groups that were funded by tobacco firms and subsequently by Exxon and other fossil fuel companies, and now actively take part in climate change denial, including the Competitive Enterprise Institute, the Cato Institute, the Heritage Foundation, the Hudson Institute, the Frontiers of Freedom Institute, the Reason Foundation, the Independent Institute, and George Mason University's Law and Economics Centre.

Opponents of vaping also identify elements of the tobacco playbook in the e-cigarette industry's response to health concerns. Tobacco companies took stakes in soft drinks companies and used the same tactics around colours and flavours that they had used to target young potential smokers. The soft drinks industry's attempts to avoid sugary beverage taxes or other government action to reduce obesity draws upon elements of the tobacco playbook, including use of Corporate Social Responsibility (CSR) programs as a PR strategy. Research contracts issued as part of CSR programmes allow soft drinks manufacturers to bury inconvenient results.

A 2019 article in the Emory Law Journal made parallels to attempts by the National Football League to downplay the issue of CTE in football, with the New York Times'' noting a number of tobacco figures involved in the NFL's defence.

The World Health Organization has subsequently published a tobacco control playbook.

The public relations strategies of Big Tech companies have often been compared with the tobacco industry playbook.

See also
 Health effects of tobacco
 Disinformation
 Corporate propaganda
 Fear, uncertainty, and doubt
 Climate change denial
 Fossil fuels lobby
 ExxonMobil climate change controversy
 COVID-19 vaccine misinformation and hesitancy

External link 
 The Disinformation Playbook – How Business Interests Deceive, Misinform, and Buy Influence at the Expense of Public Health and Safety (www.ucsusa.org)

References

External links
 Cancer by the carton

Tobacco industry
.
Disinformation
Disinformation operations
Scientific controversies
Climate change controversies
Petroleum industry
Petroleum politics
Medical controversies
Politics of climate change